The 2022 Curlers Corner Autumn Gold Curling Classic was held from October 28 to 31 at the Calgary Curling Club in Calgary, Alberta. The event was held in a triple-knockout format with a purse of $44,000.

In the final, South Korea's Gim Eun-ji rink won their second event title of the season, defeating Switzerland's Michèle Jäggi 8–2 in an all-international final. After taking two in the first end, the Korean rink opened up a four-point lead with a steal of two in the second end. The teams then traded singles through the next three ends with Team Gim continuing a three-point lead. In the sixth, Gim secured the victory for her team of Kim Min-ji, Kim Su-ji, Seol Ye-eun and Seol Ye-ji with a hit to score three points, ending the game early. To reach the final, the Korean team qualified for the playoffs through the B event with a 5–1 record. They then defeated Manitoba's Abby Ackland 7–4 in the quarterfinals and Alberta's Casey Scheidegger 5–4 in the semifinals. The Swiss Jäggi rink took a different path to the playoff round, dropping into the last chance C event early before rattling off three straight victories to qualify with a 5–2 record. They then upset the two top ranked teams in Manitoba's Kaitlyn Lawes and Jennifer Jones 6–5 in the quarterfinal and semifinal rounds respectively. Kayla Skrlik and Selena Sturmay also qualified for the playoffs but lost in the quarterfinals.

Teams
The teams are listed as follows:

Knockout brackets

Source:

A event

B event

C event

Knockout results
All draw times listed in Mountain Daylight Time (UTC-06:00).

Draw 1
Friday, October 28, 9:30 am

Draw 2
Friday, October 28, 1:15 pm

Draw 3
Friday, October 28, 5:15 pm

Draw 4
Friday, October 28, 9:00 pm

Draw 5
Saturday, October 29, 9:00 am

Draw 6
Saturday, October 29, 12:45 pm

Draw 7
Saturday, October 29, 4:30 pm

Draw 8
Saturday, October 29, 8:15 pm

Draw 9
Sunday, October 30, 9:00 am

Draw 10
Sunday, October 30, 12:45 pm

Draw 11
Sunday, October 30, 4:30 pm

Draw 12
Sunday, October 30, 8:15 pm

Playoffs

Source:

Quarterfinals
Monday, October 31, 9:00 am

Semifinals
Monday, October 31, 12:15 pm

Final
Monday, October 31, 3:30 pm

Notes

References

External links
Official Website
CurlingZone

Autumn Gold Curling Classic
2022 in Canadian curling
2022 in Alberta
October 2022 sports events in Canada
2022 in women's curling
2020s in Calgary